The Snapper (1990) is a novel by Irish writer Roddy Doyle and the second novel in The Barrytown Trilogy.

The plot revolves around unmarried Sharon Rabbitte's pregnancy, and the unexpected effects this has on her conservative, working-class Dublin family. When twenty-year-old Sharon informs her father, Jimmy Sr., and mother, Veronica, about her pregnancy, they aren't thrilled but do not display histrionics. Though they ask about the father's identity, Sharon does not tell them. Jimmy Sr. then invites Sharon out to the local pub for a drink.

Sharon's friends are as interested as her family in the father's identity, but she refuses to tell them. Instead, his identity becomes common knowledge when George Burgess, the father of Sharon's friend, Yvonne, leaves his wife and claims to feel torn between her and Sharon: George is the father, the pair have had a sexual encounter while drunk. Sharon briefly questions if the encounter was sexual assault, an interpretation that has found traction among readers. Sharon tells everyone that the father was a Spanish sailor, to avoid the embarrassment and the shame of everybody knowing. However, most of the town believes the truth. She is often criticized and made fun of because of Burgess being the father. Yvonne Burgess shuns her. Jackie, another of Sharon's friends, stands by her, which rekindles their formerly close relationship. The incident temporarily fractures Sharon's relationship with her father and causes her to quit her job as a shelf stacker. Eventually, Burgess returns to his family. Sharon gives birth to a baby girl and considers naming her Georgina.

Reception
Kirkus Reviews praised the novel, referring to it as "...warm, frank, and very funny account of family life and pregnancy".

Adaptations
The Snapper was made into a film directed by Stephen Frears and starring Tina Kellegher and Colm Meaney. The film changes the family surname from 'Rabbitte' to 'Curley' due to issues with the rights.

A version for stage premiered to acclaim at Dublin's Gate Theatre in 2018. The stage show was directed by Róisín McBrinn and revived in 2019.

BBC radio broadcast a reading of the entire Barrytown Trilogy in 2013, performed by Jim Sheridan.

References

1990 Irish novels
Novels by Roddy Doyle
Sequel novels
Novels set in Dublin (city)
Secker & Warburg books
Irish novels adapted into films